The Taichung line, also known as the Mountain line, is a line of the Taiwan Railway Administration, which one of two parallel lines in Central Taiwan section offsetting to inland mountain area. It has a total length of 85.5 km, all of which is double track, passing Downtown Taichung.

History
The Taichung Line was completed in 1908. After the Coast Line between Zhunan and Changhua was finished in 1922, the original line was called Taichung Line. In 1998, the construction to expand to two tracks (double tracks) was completed. Long tunnels were built to reduce the grade of the line. Sanyi Tunnel is one of the longest railway tunnels in Taiwan. The opening of the new segment of the line relegated the previous segment of the line to become the Old Mountain Line.

The section between Fengyuan and Daqing was rebuilt as an elevated line in 2016. Five new stations were added in 2018: Lilin, Toujiacuo, Songzhu, Jingwu, and Wuquan.

Stations

Notes:
 Tai'an Station: Earliest elevated station of TRA.

References